Goldsbrough is a surname. Notable people with the surname include:

George Ridsdale Goldsbrough (1881–1963), English mathematician and mathematical physicist
Richard Goldsbrough (1821–1886), English-born Australian businessman